The Resettlement Administration (RA) was a New Deal U.S. federal agency created May 1, 1935. It relocated struggling urban and rural families to communities planned by the federal government. On September 1, 1937, it was succeeded by the Farm Security Administration.

History
The RA was the brainchild of Rexford G. Tugwell, an economics professor at Columbia University who became an advisor to Franklin D. Roosevelt during the latter's successful campaign for the presidency in 1932 and then held positions in the United States Department of Agriculture. Roosevelt established the RA under Executive Order 7027, as one of the New Deal's "alphabet agencies", and Tugwell became its head.

The divisions of the new organization included Rural Rehabilitation, Rural Resettlement, Land Utilization, and Suburban Resettlement. Roosevelt transferred the Federal Emergency Relief Administration land program to the Resettlement Administration under Executive Order 7028 on May 1, 1935.

This goal seemed socialistic to some and threatened to deprive influential farm owners of their tenant workforce.

Relief camps for migrant workers

The main focus of the RA was to now build relief camps in California for migratory workers, especially refugees from the drought-struck Dust Bowl of the Southwest. This move was resisted by a large share of Californians, who did not want destitute migrants to settle in their midst.
The RA managed to construct 95 camps that gave migrants unaccustomed clean quarters with running water and other amenities, but the 75,000 people who had the benefit of the camps were a small share of those in need and even they could stay only temporarily. Tugwell resigned in 1936, wanting to prevent a red-baiting campaign against him from affecting the agency.

On January 1, 1937, with hopes of making the RA more effective, the Resettlement Administration was transferred to the Department of Agriculture through executive order 7530. In the face of Congressional criticism, in September 1937 the Resettlement Administration was folded into a new body, the Farm Security Administration (FSA), which operated until 1946.

Communities and greenbelt cities
The RA worked with nearly 200 communities on its projects, notably including:
 Tillery, North Carolina
 Farmstead / Jasper, Alabama, this development, began by the WPA, included 40 homes, churches, a civic center, and a school.
 Arthurdale, West Virginia, (first community begun by Subsistence Homesteads and pet project of Eleanor Roosevelt)
 Cahaba Village in Trussville, Alabama (begun by the Works Progress Administration)
 Palmerdale in Pinson, Alabama (parts built by the Works Progress Administration)
 Jersey Homesteads (begun by the Division of Subsistence Homesteads)
 Cumberland Homesteads near Crossville, Tennessee (begun by the Division of Subsistence Homesteads)
 Christian-Trigg Farms near Hopkinsville, Kentucky (built by the RA and Farm Security Administration)
 Greenbelt, Maryland, completely planned and constructed by the RA outside Washington, D.C.
 Greendale, Wisconsin, another new town built by the RA, outside Milwaukee, Wisconsin
 Greenhills, Ohio, the third of the RA's new towns, built outside Cincinnati, Ohio
 Hickory Ridge, Virginia (now Prince William Forest Park)
 Caney Lakes Recreation Area in Webster Parish, Louisiana
 Greenbrook, New Jersey (planned by the RA but never built)
Matanuska Valley Colony, Alaska (near what is now Palmer, Alaska)
 Aksarben, Nebraska
 Mileston, Mississippi, one of thirteen resettlement communities that were entirely African-American

The Weedpatch Camp (also known as the Arvin Federal Government Camp and the Sunset Labor Camp), now on the National Register of Historic Places, was built in 1936 south of Bakersfield, California — not by the Resettlement Administration but by the Works Progress Administration. The camp inspired John Steinbeck's 1939 novel, The Grapes of Wrath.

Photography, film, and folk song projects
The RA also funded projects recording aspects of its work and context, including:
 The Photography Project, which documented the rural poverty of the Great Depression and produced thousands of images that are now stored and available at the Library of Congress, was headed up by Roy Stryker.
 The Film Project, which produced two documentaries directed by Pare Lorentz and scored by Virgil Thomson, The Plow That Broke the Plains and The River;
 Sidney Robertson Cowell's recordings of folk songs, conducted during the summer of 1937, sponsored by the RA's Special Skills Division, and now stored at the University of Wisconsin.

See also
 Dust Bowl
 National Industrial Recovery Act of 1933
 Subsistence Homesteads Division

References
Citations

Sources
 Meriam; Lewis. Relief and Social Security The Brookings Institution. 1946 (analysis and statistical summary of all the New Deal relief programs)

External links

 Wisconsin Folksong Collection, 1937-1946. Presented by the University of Wisconsin Digital Collections Center and Mills Music Library Special Collections.
 Ohio History Central on Resettlement Administration
 Oklahoma History on Resettlement Administration
 Complete List of New Deal Communities, of the Resettlement Administration, the Division of Subsistence Homesteads, and the Federal Emergency Relief Administration, from the National New Deal Preservation Association
 Pine Mountain Valley Resettlement Project historical marker in Pine Mountain, Georgia

1935 establishments in the United States
New Deal agencies
Defunct agencies of the United States government
United States Department of Agriculture
Former United States Federal assistance programs
Internal migrations in the United States
Dust Bowl
Government agencies established in 1935
Settlement schemes in the United States